The DAF SB220 was a full-size single-decker bus chassis produced by DAF Bus International from 1985. Initially only built in left hand drive, in 1988 a right hand drive version was launched for the United Kingdom market. An articulated version was also manufactured.

It was superseded by the DAF/VDL SB200 and SB250.

Types
Step entrance
Low floor
Low entry

Bodywork
Makes and models of bodywork were fitted to the SB220 full-size single-decker bus chassis include the following:

United Kingdom (step entrance)
Ikarus Citibus
Northern Counties Paladin
Optare Delta

United Kingdom (low floor/low entry)
Alexander ALX300
East Lancs Myllennium
Ikarus Polaris
Ikarus 481
Plaxton Prestige / Northern Counties Paladin LF

Ireland (step entrance)
Alexander Setanta
Plaxton Verde

Netherlands (step entrance)
Berkhof ST2000NL
Den Oudsten B88
Den Oudsten B89 Alliance

Portugal (step entrance)
CAMO Camus
CAMO Cronus (Only 2 units of the "standard" version of this bodywork were produced, and both used the SB220 chassis)
Marcopolo Allegro

Spain (step entrance)
Castrosua CS 40 City
Hispano Carrocera VOV
Ugarte U-2000
Unicar U-90

Singapore (step entrance)
Alexander Setanta (1 unit used a replaced front after an accident, all retired by 1 December 2016)
Hispano Carrocera (All retired and sold to United Kingdom or New Zealand, ex-City Shuttle Service DAF SB220LT abandoned somewhere in New Zealand)

Romania (step entrance)
DAF SB 220-Castrosua (RATB Bucharest) 
DAF SB 220-Elvo (RATB Bucharest)
DAF SB 220-Hispano Carocera (RATB Bucharest)

References

External links

SB220
SB220
Bus chassis
Low-entry buses
Full-size buses
Vehicles introduced in 1985